The  is a mountain range on the borders of Nara and Osaka Prefectures on the island of Honshū in the southwest of central Japan. The range separates the Osaka Plain and the Nara Basin, and forms a natural place for the boundary between the prefectures. The primary mountain in the range is Mount Kongō, and is contained within the Kongō-Ikoma-Kisen Quasi-National Park.

Geography
At Chihaya Pass, the ridgeline turns west and the Izumi Mountains begin at that point. They stretch along the border between Osaka and Wakayama Prefectures.

Mountains in the range
Listed in order of elevation.
Mount Kongō, 
Mount Yamato Katsuragi, 
Iwahashi Mountain, 
Mount Nijō has two peaks:
Odake, 
Medake, 
Myōjin Mountain,

Gallery

References

Nara Prefecture
Osaka Prefecture
Wakayama Prefecture